Charles Agar (September 5, 1882 – January 1961) was a farmer and political figure in Saskatchewan, Canada. He represented Saskatoon County from 1921 to 1934 as a Progressive Party member then as a Liberal and Hanley from 1934 to 1944 as a Liberal in the Legislative Assembly of Saskatchewan.

Biography 
Agar was born in Belfast, Ontario, (located in what is now Ashfield-Colborne-Wawanosh), was educated in Ontario and came to Saskatchewan in 1905. He was Speaker of the Legislative Assembly of Saskatchewan  from 1938 to 1944. Agar was defeated when he ran for reelection in the 1944 Saskatchewan election that brought Tommy Douglas and the Saskatchewan CCF to power.

He died in Saskatoon at the age of 78.

References 
 

Saskatchewan Liberal Party MLAs
Speakers of the Legislative Assembly of Saskatchewan
1882 births
1961 deaths
Progressive Party of Saskatchewan MLAs